Jamaica competed at the 2016 Winter Youth Olympics in Lillehammer, Norway from 12 to 21 February 2016. The team will consist of one male athlete in Bobsleigh. The country will be making its Winter Youth Olympics debut.

Competitors

Bobsleigh

Jamaica qualified one boy.

See also
Jamaica at the 2016 Summer Olympics

References

Nations at the 2016 Winter Youth Olympics
Jamaica at the Youth Olympics
2016 in Jamaican sport